JWH-120 is a synthetic cannabimimetic that was discovered by John W. Huffman. It is the N-propyl analog of JWH-122. It is a potent and selective ligand for the CB2 receptor, but a weaker ligand for the CB1 receptor.  It has a binding affinity of Ki = 6.1 ± 0.7 nM at the CB2 subtype and 173 times selectivity over the CB1 subtype.

In the United States, all CB1 receptor agonists of the 3-(1-naphthoyl)indole class such as JWH-120 are Schedule I Controlled Substances.

See also 

 JWH-122
 JWH-193
 JWH-210
 JWH-398

References 

JWH cannabinoids
Naphthoylindoles
CB1 receptor agonists
CB2 receptor agonists